This is a list of notable hip hop music record labels:

0–9 
 4th & Broadway
 75 Ark
 300 Entertainment
 1017 Brick Squad Records

A 
 Aftermath Entertainment
 Aggro Berlin
 Ahdasee Records
 Allido Records
 Amalgam Digital
 Amaru Entertainment
 American King Music
 ANTI-
 Anticon
 Arista
 Asylum Records
 ATIC Records
 Atlantic Records
 Avatar Records

B 
 B-Boy Records
 B.O.S.S.
 Babygrande Records
 Bad Boy Records
 Barely Breaking Even
 Beluga Heights Records
 Big Beat Records
 Big Dada
 Big Hit Entertainment
 Big Up Entertainment
Billion Headz Music Group
 Black Butter Records
 Black Jays 
 Black Kapital Records 
 The Black Wall Street Records
 Blacksmith Records
 Block Entertainment
 Bloodline Records
 BME Recordings
 BMG
 Body Head Entertainment
 Brick Squad Monopoly
 Bruc Records
 Bungalo Records
 BTNH Worldwide
 Boy Better Know

C 
 Cactus Jack Records
 Capitol Hill Music
 Cash Money Records
 Celestial Recordings
 Chamillitary Entertainment
 Chopper City Records
 Cold Chillin' Records
 Columbia Records
 Cross Movement Records
 Czar Entertainment

D 
 D-Block Records
 Dame Dash Music Group
 Dawn Raid Entertainment
 Death Row Records
 Def Jam Recordings
 Def Jam South
 Definitive Jux
 Delicious Vinyl
 Deluxe Records
 Dented Records
 Derrty Ent.
 Desert Storm
 Diplomat Records
 Dirty Records
 Disturbing tha Peace
 Doggystyle Records
 Doomtree
 D.P.G. Recordz
 Dragon Mob Records
 Dream Chasers Records
 Dreamville Records
 Duck Down Records
 Dunk Yer Funk Records

E 
 Eastern Conference Records
 EG Records
 Elefant Traks
 Elektra Entertainment
 Enjoy Records
 Epic Records
 Epidemic Records
 Ersguterjunge
 Exceptional Records

F 
 FFRR Records
 Finger Lickin' Records
 First Priority Music
 Fitamin Un
 Flipmode Entertainment
 Fondle 'Em Records
 Fort Knocks Entertainment
 Four Music
 Freebandz
 Fresh Records
 Frontline Records
 Fueled by Ramen
 Full Surface Records
 Funk Volume

G  
 G-Funk Entertainment
 G-Unit Records
 Gangsta Advisory Records
 Gee Street Records
 Geffen Records
 Get Low Recordz
 The Goldmind Inc. 
 GOOD Music
 Godzilla Entertainment
 Good Hands Records
 Grade A Productions
 Grand Hustle Records
 Greenhouse Music

H 
 Hades Records
 Hefty Records
 Hidden Beach Recordings
 Hieroglyphics Imperium Recordings
 Hollywood BASIC
 Hoo-Bangin' Records
 Humble Beast
 Hydra Entertainment
 Hypnotize Minds

I 
 Ice Age Entertainment
 Ill Flava Records
 Ill Will Records
 Imperial Records
 Infinity Records
 Internet Money
 Interscope Records
 It's A Wonderful World Music Group
 The Inc. Records

J 
 J Records
 JDC Records
 Jive Records
 Joe & Joey Records

K 
 Kennis Music
 Kon Live Distribution
 Konvict Muzik
 Kross Over Entertainment

L 
 LaFace Records
 Legendary Music
 Legit Ballin'
 Lench Mob Records
 Lex Records
 Loud Records
 Low Life Records
 Luke Records
 Love Renaissance

M 
 M3 Records
 Machete Music
 Mango Records
 Maybach Music Group
 Mello Music Group
 Merck Records
 Millennium Records
 Mo' Wax
 Moda Records
 Mosley Music Group
 Motown Records
 Mush Records
 Music from the Corner
 Music of Life
 Mo Thugs Records

N 
 Nature Sounds
 Nervous Records
 Never Broke Again
 Next Plateau Entertainment
 Ninja Tune
 No Limit Records
 Noo Trybe Records

O 
 Obese Records
 ODA/Capalot Records
 OFWGKTA
 Ogopa DJs
 One Records
 Open Bar Entertainment
 OVO Sound 
 Oxygen Music Works

P 
 Peanuts & Corn Records
 Poe Boy Entertainment
 Polo Grounds Music
 Positive Tone
 Priority Records
 Prism Records
 Profile Records
 Project Blowed
 Prosto Records
 Psycho+Logical-Records
 Psychopathic Records
 Purple Ribbon Records

Q 
 QN5
 Quannum Projects
 Queen Bee Entertainment
 Quality Control Music

R 
 Racetrack Records
 Rap-A-Lot Records
 Rawkus Records
 Re-Up Records
 Reach Records
 Relentless Records
 Remedy Records
 Rhymesayers Entertainment
 Rhythm King
 Roc Nation
 Roc-A-Fella Records
 Roc-La-Familia
 Rock Bottom Entertainment
 Ropeadope Records
 Rowdy Records
 Royal Empire Records
 Rude Boy Records
 RuffNation Records
 Ruff Ryders Entertainment
 Russell Simmons Music Group
 Ruthless Records

S 
 S. Carter Records
 Select Records
 Selfmade Records
 Shady Records
 Sho'nuff Records
 Sleeping Bag Records
 Slip-N-Slide Records
 Smoke-A-Lot Records
 So So Def Recordings
 SoBe Entertainment
 SRC Records
 Stacks on Deck Entertainment
 Star Trak Entertainment
 Stones Throw Records
 Storch Music Company
 Strange Famous Records
 Strange Music
 Street Records Corporation
 Street Sounds (Record Label)
 Streetsweepers Entertainment
 Suave House Records
 Sub Verse Music
 Suburban Noize Records
 Sugar Hill Records
 Swishahouse
 Symbolic Records (Maldives)

T 
 Take Fo' Records
 Tan Cressida
 Taylor Gang Records
 Tayster and Rojac Records
 Tee Productions
 Ten12 Records
 Thizz Entertainment
 Thump Records
 Tokyo Dawn Records
 Tommy Boy Records
 Top Dawg Entertainment
 Trend Records
 Tres Records
 Trill Entertainment
 Tru 'Dat' Entertainment
 Tuff City Records
 Thug Line Records

U 
 The Ultimate Group
 Uncensored Records
 Uncle Howie Records
 Unda K9 Records
 Undercover Prodigy
 Unidisc Music Inc.
 Up Above Records
 UpFront Records
 Uptown Records
 URBNET Records
 UTP Records

V 
 Villain Entertainment
 Visionary Music Group

W 
 Wall of Sound
 Web Entertainment
 Wild Pitch Records
 Winley Records
 Wu-Tang Records

X 
 XO Records

Y 
 YG Entertainment
 Young Money Entertainment
 YSL Records

Z 
 Zomba Recording
 ZYX Music

See also

 List of record labels
 List of electronic music record labels
 List of independent UK record labels

 
Hip hop